The 2012–13 Servette FC season is the 122nd season in club history.

Review and events

Matches

Legend

Super League

League fixtures and results

League table

Results summary

Swiss Cup

UEFA Europa League

Qualifying rounds

Second qualifying round

Third qualifying round

Squad

Squad, appearances and goals

Minutes played

Starting 11

Bookings

Coaching staff

Sources

Servette FC
Servette FC
Servette FC seasons